Several Canadian naval units have been named HMCS Moncton.
  (I), a Flower-class corvette that served in the Royal Canadian Navy during the Battle of the Atlantic.

Battle honours
 Atlantic, 1942–1944.

References
 Directorate of History and Heritage - HMCS Moncton 

Royal Canadian Navy ship names